No Time to Die is a 2021 spy film based on the Ian Fleming character James Bond, produced by Eon Productions and distributed by Universal Pictures and United Artists Releasing. It is the sequel to Spectre (2015) and the twenty-fifth Eon-produced James Bond film. Directed by Cary Joji Fukunaga from a screenplay by Neal Purvis, Robert Wade, Fukunaga, and Phoebe Waller-Bridge, it stars Daniel Craig as Bond, alongside Rami Malek, Léa Seydoux, Lashana Lynch, Ben Whishaw, Naomie Harris, Jeffrey Wright, Christoph Waltz, and Ralph Fiennes. In the film, Bond, retired from active service with MI6, is recruited by the CIA to find a kidnapped scientist, which leads to a showdown with Lyutsifer Safin (Malek).

No Time to Die premiered globally at the Royal Albert Hall on 28 September 2021, and was released on 30 September in the United Kingdom and on 8 October in the United States. Made on a production budget of $250–301 million, No Time to Die has grossed over $774 million worldwide, making it the fourth-highest-grossing film of 2021. On the review aggregator website Rotten Tomatoes, the film holds an approval rating of  based on  reviews.

The film has received various awards and nominations. At the 94th Academy Awards, No Time to Die received three Oscar nominations, and won for Best Original Song (for "No Time to Die"), becoming the third consecutive series theme song (starring Craig) to do so after Skyfall (2012) and Spectre. The song received several Best Original Song awards, including from the Grammy Awards, the Golden Globe Awards, and the Critics' Choice Movie Awards. No Time to Die received a nomination for Best Action or Adventure Film at the 47th Saturn Awards.

Accolades

See also
 List of accolades received by Skyfall

Notes

References

External links
 

Lists of accolades by film
James Bond lists
NBCUniversal-related lists